Bean Creek may refer to:

Bean Creek (Zayante Creek tributary), a stream in California
Bean Creek (Salt River tributary), a stream in Missouri